Jeron Al-Hazaimeh (born 13 February 1992) is a German professional footballer who plays as a defender for German club Wuppertaler SV.

Early life 
Al-Hazaimeh was born to German parents Winfried and Angelika; his mother was previously married to a Jordanian man, taking his surname, and had four children with him. As she wanted all her children to have the same surname, she passed it to Jeron as well.

Both his parents were footballers, with his father having played at Fortuna Düsseldorf.

References

External links
 
 

1992 births
Living people
German footballers
Association football defenders
Fortuna Düsseldorf players
Chemnitzer FC players
Sportfreunde Lotte players
SC Preußen Münster players
SV Meppen players
Wuppertaler SV players
3. Liga players
Regionalliga players
Footballers from Düsseldorf